The Lotto–Dstny Development Team is a Belgian UCI Continental road cycling team founded in 2007 that acts as the development program for UCI ProTeam .

Team roster

Major results

2013
  Points classification Circuit des Ardennes International, Tiesj Benoot
 Young rider classification, Tiesj Benoot
 Stage 1 Le Triptyque des Monts et Châteaux, Jorne Carolus
2014
  Overall Ronde de l'Isard, Louis Vervaeke
 Young rider classification, Tiesj Benoot
 Paris–Arras Tour
Teams classification
Stage 3, Daniel McLay
2015
 Stage 2 Carpathian Couriers Race, Dries Van Gestel
  Points classification Giro della Valle d'Aosta, Laurens De Plus
Stage 1, Laurens De Plus
2016
  Overall Ronde de l'Isard, Bjorg Lambrecht
 Points classification, Bjorg Lambrecht
 Mountains classification, Bjorg Lambrecht
 Young rider classification, Bjorg Lambrecht
Teams classification
Stage 1, Bjorg Lambrecht
 Grand Prix des Marbriers, Emiel Planckaert
 Piccolo Giro di Lombardia, Harm Vanhoucke
  Young rider classification Tour du Loir-et-Cher, Edward Planckaert
Stage 1, Michael Goolaerts
 Stage 2 Tour de Savoie Mont-Blanc, Harm Vanhoucke
 Stage 3 Peace Race U23, Bjorg Lambrecht
2017
 Stage 1 Okolo Jižních Čech, team time trial
 Stage 2 Ronde van Midden-Nederland, Alfdan De Decker
2018
  Young rider classification Okolo Jižních Čech, Stan Dewulf
Stage 1, team time trial
2019
  Mountains classification Circuit des Ardennes International, Kobe Goossens
Teams classification
2020
  Overall Ronde de l'Isard, Xandres Vervloesem
 Points classification, Henri Vandenabeele
 Mountains classification, Henri Vandenabeele
 Young rider classification, Xandres Vervloesem
Teams classification
Stage 2a, Henri Vandenabeele
 Piccolo Giro di Lombardia, Harry Sweeny
  Young rider classification Tour de Savoie Mont-Blanc, Maxim Van Gils
Stage 2, Viktor Verschaeve
  Young rider classification Course de Solidarność et des Champions Olympiques, Ruben Apers
Teams classification
  Young rider classification Giro della Regione Friuli Venezia Giulia, Henri Vandenabeele
 Stage 1 Tour Bitwa Warszawska 1920, Arne Marit
2021 
 Stages 2 & 5 Tour Alsace, Arnaud De Lie
  Overall Okolo Jižních Čech, Arnaud De Lie
Stage 1, Arnaud De Lie

Notes

References

External links

UCI Continental Teams (Europe)
Cycling teams based in Belgium
Cycling teams established in 2007
Lotto–Soudal